Ravel Law is a startup which offers free access to computer-assisted legal research. The firm has funded a major scanning project at the Harvard Law School library known as "Free the Law". The project aims to have the full collection of 40 million pages digitized by 2017. According to the initial announcement, access to the library during the first eight years will be granted to non-profit organizations and partners of Ravel Law before completely opening to the public. Ravel Law was acquired by RELX to be part of the LexisNexis suite of tools in June, 2017.

Business plan
In addition to basic free access to the public the firm offers more sophisticated plans to legal firms and researchers.

See also
 Free Access to Law Movement
 RECAP
 vLex

References

External links
Homepage Ravel Law

Online law databases
Legal research